Colin John Jamieson, AO JP (26 May 1923 – 27 March 1990), was a politician in Western Australia. A member of the Labor Party, he served as a member of the Western Australian Legislative Assembly from 1953 until 1986, as the Minister for Works and Water Supplies in the Tonkin Ministry (1971–1974) and as Leader of the Opposition (1976–1978). Ron Davies succeeded him in the latter role. He was defeated by incumbent Liberal Premier Sir Charles Court at the state election of 1977.

Biography
The son of George Archibald Jamieson, a vineyard employee and World War I veteran, and nurse Mona Colvin, Colin Jamieson was born in Perth on 26 May 1923. His grandfather, Archibald ("Scottie"), originated from the Orkney Islands, was involved in the creation of the Midland Railway Workers Union and was mayor of Midland Junction Municipality in 1914–1915. At age five, Jamieson's mother died of septicaemia arising from complications from the birth of his brother, and from then on he was looked after by aunts and then by his maternal grandparents. He attended Midland, Victoria Park and Leederville primary schools, and the Junior Technical College in West Perth.

Completing his formal education at 15, he worked at the Metropolitan Markets as an assistant fruit and produce merchant, then at a motor body works with the intention of becoming apprenticed, before enlisting in the Australian Imperial Force on 30 July 1942. He was assigned to the 121 Reserve Motor Transport Company with the rank of Corporal, transferring to the Royal Australian Air Force in 1944 as a radar mechanic with the rank of Leading Aircraftman. After discharge in April 1946, Jamieson worked first as a labourer and storeman at the Midland Railway Workshops, and became active in union matters until leaving the company to train as a carpenter and joiner under an ex-serviceman's scheme. On 14 May 1960, he married Emily Margaret Male at the Holy Family Church in Como, with Ron Davies in attendance as best man. The couple had two children, a son and a daughter.

Jamieson was heavily involved in community service throughout his life – particularly amateur football whose state organisation he served from 1947 until 1986 as an executive member and later as president, although he was also a keen tennis player. In 1971, he was presented by a Certificate of Merit from the National Football League for his services to amateur football. He also supported several horticultural societies, and was a regular and successful exhibitor of roses, dahlias and chrysanthemums.

After his retirement from politics in 1986, he served as chairman of the Metropolitan Cemeteries Board and Fremantle Cemeteries Board. In 1988, he was awarded the Order of Australia for his services to the Western Australian Parliament and the community. He died at St John of God Hospital, Subiaco, on 27 March 1990 after a short illness, and was cremated in Karrakatta Cemetery. A drive within Fremantle Cemetery and a road within the industrial suburb of Welshpool on the former site of the Main Roads depot were named in his honour.

Political career
Jamieson was elected into office at the 1974 state election. He was a member of the Labor Party, which was in Opposition. He was a member of Tonkin shadow ministry from March 1974 until 15 April 1976. In 1976 Tonkin retired and Jamieson became the State Leader of Labor Party.

References

1923 births
1990 deaths
Members of the Western Australian Legislative Assembly
Leaders of the Opposition in Western Australia
Australian Labor Party members of the Parliament of Western Australia
Politicians from Perth, Western Australia
Royal Australian Air Force personnel of World War II
Australian Army soldiers
Officers of the Order of Australia
Australian people of Scottish descent
20th-century Australian politicians
Australian Army personnel of World War II
Royal Australian Air Force airmen
Energy Ministers of Western Australia